Paul Riesen (born 1 October 1906, date of death unknown) was a Swiss athlete. He competed in the men's high jump at the 1932 Summer Olympics.

References

1906 births
Year of death missing
Athletes (track and field) at the 1932 Summer Olympics
Swiss male high jumpers
Olympic athletes of Switzerland
Place of birth missing